Caldwell Hill is an unincorporated community located in Carter County, Oklahoma, United States. The elevation is 823 feet.

References

Unincorporated communities in Oklahoma